Cossmann is a German surname. Notable people with the surname include:

Bernhard Cossmann (1822–1910), German cellist
Maurice Cossmann (1850–1924), French paleontologist and malacologist
Paul Nikolaus Cossmann (1869-1942), German journalist, son of Bernhard

See also
Cosman
Cossman
Kossmann

German-language surnames